NCAA Season 97 is the 2021–22 athletic year of the National Collegiate Athletic Association in the Philippines hosted by De La Salle - College of Saint Benilde.

Background 
Colegio de San Juan de Letran's chairman awarded the Head of Sports Varsity and External Relation to the host by giving him the NCAA Flag and to host NCAA Season 97 in the closing ceremony. The Commission on Higher Education held a COVID-19 vaccination drive for the NCAA's student athletes which led the NCAA Management Committee (MANCOM) to seriously consider the return of face-to-face events after solely holding online events in the last season due to the prevailing COVID-19 pandemic.

The opening of season 97 was originally scheduled to begin on March 5, 2022 but was postponed to March 26, 2022 and tipped-off at St. Benilde Gym.

NCAA Season 97, which has the theme of “Stronger Together. Buo ang Puso”, will have a five gamedays a week calendar (Tuesday-Wednesday & Friday-Sunday). Two games will take place during each gameday. The NCAA will only hold a single round-robin tournament with a play-in. The third- and fourth-ranked teams will face off after the regular season to determine the third seed. The loser of the game will face the winner of the bout between the fifth and sixth-ranked schools to determine the fourth seed.

Basketball 

The season will be held with five gamedays a week calendar, with two games being played in each gameday. These gamedays are scheduled between Tuesdays, Wednesdays, Fridays, Saturdays and Sundays.

Seniors' tournament

Elimination round

Play-in tournament

Playoffs

Volleyball

Women's tournament

Elimination round

Playoffs

Taekwondo

Seniors' tournament

Men

Women

Juniors' tournament

References

See also 

 UAAP Season 84

2022 in multi-sport events
2022 in Philippine sport
National Collegiate Athletic Association (Philippines) seasons